Steve Stanton is a Canadian author, editor, and publisher.

He founded Skysong Press in 1988 and published the literary fanzine Dreams & Visions for twenty years, as well as the Sky Songs anthology series, 2002–2005. He served on the Board of Directors of SF Canada for seven years from 2007 to 2014, including three years as President of the association from 2011 to 2014, when he established the bilingual SF Canada Awards.
 
Steve Stanton's science fiction stories have been published in sixteen countries and a dozen languages, and his cyberpunk trilogy, The Bloodlight Chronicles, was published by ECW Press in Toronto: this trilogy consists of Reconciliation (2010), Retribution (2011), and Redemption (2012). Library Journal said this "elegantly written" science fiction series "revitalizes the cyber-fiction genre with its vivid prose and believable characters." A fourth science fiction novel, Freenet, was published in 2016 by ECW Press.

References

External links 
 Steve Stanton (official web site)
 SF Canada (official web site)
 Skysong Press

Canadian science fiction writers
Canadian fantasy writers
Living people
Year of birth missing (living people)